Scarcewater is a hamlet west-northwest of St Stephen-in-Brannel in mid Cornwall, England, United Kingdom.

References

Hamlets in Cornwall